The  2018–19 season will be the 93rd season of competitive football by Universitatea Cluj, and the 1st in Liga II, after two years of absence, being promoted at the end of the previous season of Liga III. Universitatea Cluj will compete in the Liga II and in Cupa României.

Season overview

Background

Previous season positions

First-team squad 

Last updated on 8 February 2019

Transfers and loans

Transfers in

Transfers out

Loans out

Pre-season and friendlies

Competitions

Overview

Liga II

The Liga II fixture list was announced on 19 July 2018.

League table

Results summary

Position by round

Matches

Promotion Play Off

As Universitatea Cluj lost the Promotion play-off on aggregate 2–1, Universitatea Cluj remained in Liga II for another season.

Cupa României

Statistics

Appearances and goals

|-
|}

Squad statistics
{|class="wikitable" style="text-align: center;"
|-
! 
! style="width:70px;"|Liga II
! style="width:70px;"|Cupa României
! style="width:70px;"|Home
! style="width:70px;"|Away
! style="width:70px;"|Total Stats
|-
|align=left|Games played       || 0 || 0 || 0 || 0 || 0 
|-
|align=left|Games won          || 0 || 0 || 0 || 0 || 0 
|-
|align=left|Games drawn        || 0 || 0 || 0 || 0 || 0 
|-
|align=left|Games lost         || 0 || 0 || 0 || 0 || 0 
|-
|align=left|Goals scored       || 0 || 0 || 0 || 0 || 0 
|-
|align=left|Goals conceded     || 0 || 0 || 0 || 0 || 0 
|-
|align=left|Goal difference    || 0 || 0 || 0 || 0 || 0 
|-
|align=left|Clean sheets       || 0 || 0 || 0 || 0 || 0 
|-
|align=left|Goal by Substitute || 0 || 0 || 0 || 0 || 0 
|-
|align=left|Players used       || – || – || – || – || – 
|-
|align=left|Yellow cards       || 0 || 0 || 0 || 0 || 0 
|-
|align=left|Red cards          || 0 || 0 || 0 || 0 || 0 
|-
|align=left| Winning rate      || 0% || 0% || 0% || 0% || 0% 
|-

Goalscorers

Goal minutes

Last updated: 2018 (UTC) 
Source: [Source: Soccerway]

Hat-tricks

Clean sheets

Disciplinary record

Attendances

See also

 2018–19 Liga II
 2018–19 Cupa României

References

FC Universitatea Cluj seasons
Universitatea, Cluj, FC